Torodora chinanensis is a moth in the family Lecithoceridae. It is found in Taiwan. The specific name chinanensis refers to the  type locality, Chinanshan ("Mt. Chinan") in Kaohsiung.

The wingspan is 25 mm. Adults have a large, yellowish triangular patch on the inner margin of the forewing mesially (toward the center).

References

Torodora
Moths of Taiwan
Endemic fauna of Taiwan
Moths described in 2003